The Acme Aircraft Co S-1 Sierra was an experimental aircraft of unusual configuration built in the US in 1948 to investigate the advantages of a pusher propeller configuration. Apart from this engine installation, the aircraft was unusual in having an X-shaped tail incorporating ruddervators on the upper fins. The wing was mounted midway up the fuselage and was unswept. During the 1960s, the US aerospace manufacturer Northrop used the aircraft as a technology demonstrator for boundary layer control concepts.

Specifications (S-1 Sierra)

See also

References

External links
 Aircraft Ab – Ak#Acme Aerofiles
 Acme Sierra website

1940s United States experimental aircraft
Aircraft manufactured in the United States
V-tail aircraft
Single-engined pusher aircraft